Oakington railway station was a station in Oakington, Cambridgeshire, on the line between Cambridge and St Ives. It opened in 17 August 1847 and was closed during the Beeching Axe in 5 October 1970. The station building remains as a private house but the track has been replaced by the Cambridgeshire Guided Busway.

References

External links
Oakington station on navigable 1946 O. S. map

Disused railway stations in Cambridgeshire
Former Great Eastern Railway stations
Railway stations in Great Britain opened in 1847
Railway stations in Great Britain closed in 1970
Beeching closures in England
1847 establishments in England